The men's 15 kilometre classical competition in cross-country skiing at the 2022 Winter Olympics was held on 11 February, at the Kuyangshu Nordic Center and Biathlon Center in Zhangjiakou. The event was won by Iivo Niskanen of Finland. Alexander Bolshunov, representing the Russian Olympic Committee, won silver, and Johannes Høsflot Klæbo of Norway became the bronze medalist.

Summary
The 15 km distance event alternates between the Olympics, and in 2018 it was the freestyle event. The defending champion was Dario Cologna, who won this distance three times in a row (in 2010, 2014, and 2018), as well as 30k skiathlon in 2014. He finished in the 44th position. The silver medalist Simen Hegstad Krüger qualified for the Olympics but tested positive for COVID just before the games and was not able to start. The bronze medalist Denis Spitsov qualified as well, but did not start either. The overall leader of the 2021–22 FIS Cross-Country World Cup before the Olympics was Klæbo, and the distance leader was Bolshunov. The season was dominated by the Norwegians and Russians, who together took 20 podium places in distance events out of 24, and three more podium places were taken Niskanen. Hans Christer Holund was the 2021 World Champion in 15 km freestyle.

Niskanen was consistently leading for the whole distance. Klæbo started the first of the three eventual medalists, but Niskanen was 37.5 seconds faster. Bolshunov, who started after Niskanen, was consistently second.

Qualification

Results

References

Men's cross-country skiing at the 2022 Winter Olympics